Francisco (Paco) Santos Leal (born May 28, 1968) is a Spanish mathematician at the University of Cantabria, known for finding a counterexample to the Hirsch conjecture in polyhedral combinatorics. In 2015 he won the Fulkerson Prize for this research.

Santos was born in Valladolid, Spain. He earned a licenciate in mathematics from the University of Cantabria in 1991, and a master's degree in pure mathematics from Joseph Fourier University in Grenoble, France in the same year. He returned to Cantabria for his doctorate, which he finished in 1995, with a thesis on the combinatorial geometry of algebraic curves and Delaunay triangulations supervised by Tomás Recio. He also has a second licenciate, in physics, from Cantabria in 1996. After postdoctoral studies at the University of Oxford he returned to Cantabria as a faculty member in 1997, and was promoted to full professor in 2008. From 2009 to 2013 he has been vice-dean of the Faculty of Sciences at Cantabria.

As well as being honored by the Fulkerson Prize in 2015 for a counter-example of the Hirsch conjecture, he was an invited sectional speaker at the 2006 International Congress of Mathematicians.

Santos is an Editor-in-Chief of the Electronic Journal of Combinatorics.

References

External links
Home page
Google scholar profile

1968 births
Living people
People from Valladolid
Geometers
Academic staff of the University of Cantabria
20th-century  Spanish  mathematicians
21st-century  Spanish mathematicians
Grenoble Alpes University alumni